A Wealth of Fable by Harry Warner, Jr., is a Hugo Award-winning history of science fiction fandom of the 1950s, an essential reference work in the field. It is a follow-up to Warner's All Our Yesterdays, which covered the 1940s, and helped to earn Warner a Hugo Award in 1969.

According to science fiction fan and author Mike Resnick, "It's not even a sequel, but rather a continuation, of All Our Yesterdays, heavily illustrated, obviously written by the same hand, chock full of the anecdotes that almost instantly become fannish legend."

It was originally published by Joe Siclari in a three-volume, mimeographed Fanhistorica Press edition in 1977. SCIFI Press brought out an expanded hardcover edition in 1992. The members of the World Science Fiction Society voted that version the Hugo Award for Best Related Book.

Warner also wrote a related series of historical columns called "All Our Yesterdays."

External links
Publisher's information on A Wealth of Fable
Publisher's information on All Our Yesterdays
All Our Yesterdays columns

Footnotes and references

1977 books
20th-century history books
Science fiction books
History books about literature
Hugo Award for Best Non-Fiction Book winning works